On 11 April 2006, a bombing at Nishtar Park in Karachi, Pakistan resulted in the deaths of at least 49 people and injured around a hundred others. At the time of the blast, a mawlid ceremony to mark the birthday of the Prophet Mohammed organised by the Barelvi Jamaat Ahle Sunnat was taking place, in which tens of thousands of followers were gathered.

Among the dead were several Barelvi religious figures, including the senior leadership of the Jamaat Ahle Sunnat and the Sunni Tehreek. The notable leaders included Chief of Sunni Tehreek, Maulana Muhammad Abbas Qadri, central leaders Maulana Akram Qadri, Maulana Iftikhar Ahmad Bhatti, Dr. Qadeer Ahmad and Haji Haneef Billo, Hafiz Muhammad Taqi of other parties. Three men said to belong to the Lashkar-e-Jhangvi were indicted for the crime.

References

2006 murders in Pakistan
April 2006 events in Pakistan
Mass murder in 2006
Improvised explosive device bombings in Pakistan
Terrorist incidents in Pakistan in 2006
Barelvi
2000s in Karachi
Terrorist incidents in Karachi